Bull Canyon is a canyon at the top of Palm Canyon Wash, which is a tributary to the Whitewater River, in Riverside County, California.

References

Landforms of Riverside County, California